Bernd Schattner (born 27 June 1968) is a German politician for the AfD and since 2021 member of the Bundestag, the federal diet.

Life and politics 

Schattner was born 1968 in the West German village of Annweiler am Trifels and became a salesman.

Schattner was elected to the Bundestag in 2021.

References 

Living people
1968 births
Members of the Bundestag 2021–2025
21st-century German politicians
People from Südliche Weinstraße
Alternative for Germany politicians